is a Japanese futsal player who plays for Nagoya Oceans and the Japanese national futsal team.

Career 
He was born in Shiga Prefecture, Japan. In March 2007, he graduated Shiga Prefectural Kusatsu Higashi High School. In April 2007, he entered Doshisha University. In 2009, he moved Vasagey Oita in the F.League. In 2010, he moved Deução Kobe. In 2012, he moved Nagoya Oceans. From 2013 to 2014, he was captain of Nagoya Oceans.

In July 2015, he moved to Magna Gurpea in the Spanish First Division on loan. In June 2017, he returned to Nagoya Oceans.

In August 2019, Nagoya Oceans won the AFC Futsal Club Championship, he was selected the Most Valuable Player.

Title 
 Nagoya Oceans
 AFC Futsal Club Championship (3) : 2014, 2016, 2019
 F.League (5) : 2012–13, 2013–14, 2014–15, 2017–18, 2018-19
 All Japan Futsal Championship (4) : 2013, 2014, 2018, 2019
 F.League Ocean Cup (5) : 2012, 2013, 2014, 2018, 2019

 Japan National Futsal Team
 AFC Futsal Championship (1) : 2014

 Indivisual
 F.League Best 5 (1) : 2018-19
 F.League MVP (1) : 2018-19
 AFC Futsal Club Championship MVP (1) : 2019

References

External links

1989 births
Living people
Futsal forwards
Japanese men's futsal players
Nagoya Oceans players
People from Shiga Prefecture